Veľké Pole is a village and municipality in the Žarnovica District, Banská Bystrica Region in Slovakia.

History
Hochwies - a Carpathian Germans village in the Hauerland, from the 13th century to 1945, in the territory of today's Slovakia.

References

External links
https://web.archive.org/web/20070513023228/http://www.statistics.sk/mosmis/eng/run.html
http://www.imm.hs-karlsruhe.de/slovakei/index.php?lang=eng

Villages and municipalities in Žarnovica District